The 1908–09 Drexel Blue and Gold men's basketball team represented Drexel Institute of Art, Science and Industry during the 1908–09 men's basketball season. The Blue and Gold, who were led by head coach F. Bennett at the beginning of the season until he was replaced by G. Doughty, played their home games at Main Building.

Roster

Schedule

|-
!colspan=9 style="background:#F8B800; color:#002663;"| Regular season
|-

References

Drexel Dragons men's basketball seasons
Drexel
Drexel
Drexel
Drexel
Drexel